Greenlee is an American industrial and electrical tool company headquartered in Rockford, Illinois. It was founded in 1862 by brothers Robert and Ralph Greenlee to manufacture their invention, a drill surrounded by four chisel blades, used in making the pockets for a mortise and tenon joint, for the furniture industry in Rockford. This device is still used in cabinetmaking. The brothers later diversified into a variety of hand woodworking tools as well as machinery for making wooden barrels. The company was acquired by Textron in 1986. Greenlee purchased Fairmont Hydraulics in 1992 and German tool manufacturer Klauke in 1996. Greenlee expanded into data/telecommunications equipment with the acquisition of several companies in 1999 and 2000 which now fall under the Greenlee Communications brand. Greenlee expanded its DIY offering with the addition of Paladin Tools on December 17, 2007. In 2008, Greenlee acquired Utilux. In 2013, Sherman + Reilly, and HD Electric joined the Greenlee family of Utility brands. The Greenlee brothers were inspired into industrial work by their father who was a cooper. Their contributions to the railroad industry included an automatic tie and track laying and drilling machine that rolled right along behind on the track it had just laid.

On April 18, 2018, Textron announced that it planned to sell its Greenlee brand to Emerson within 90 days. Greenlee is listed as a subsidiary and/or affiliate of Emerson Electric Co. as of September 30, 2019.

Products 

Cable Pulling & Fishing - cable pullers, wire fishing
Knockouts - Knockout sets, punches, dies, drivers
Power Tool Accessories - step bits, auger bits, drill & taps
Bending - electric conduit benders, hydraulic benders & pumps, mechanical benders
Wire and cable termination - Cable crimpers & cutters
Testing and measurement - Low & high voltage test and measurement tools
Storage and material handling - storage boxes, wire carts, stands
Utility hydraulic tools - pumps, breakers, impact wrenches
General purpose & Safety Tools - professional hand tool kits, manual bolt cutters, insulated hand tools

References

External links 
 
 Official Klauke website

Electrical tool manufacturers
Tool manufacturing companies of the United States
Manufacturing companies based in Illinois
Companies based in Rockford, Illinois
Manufacturing companies established in 1862
1862 establishments in Illinois
1986 mergers and acquisitions
2018 mergers and acquisitions
Textron